Piraju is a municipality in the state of São Paulo in Brazil. The population is 29,970 (2021 est.) in an area of 504.5 km². The elevation is 646 m. This place name comes from the Tupi language, meaning "yellow fish".

References

External links 
  https://www.facebook.com/empiraju

Municipalities in São Paulo (state)